Events from the year 2019 in Macau, China.

Incumbents
 Chief Executive: Fernando Chui
 President of the Legislative Assembly: Ho Iat Seng

Events

 
Years of the 21st century in Macau
2010s in Macau
Macau
Macau